Ralph Percy Lewis (October 8, 1872 – December 4, 1937) was an American actor of the silent film era.

Born in 1872 in Englewood, Illinois, Lewis attended Northwestern University. 

Lewis appeared in 160 films between 1912 and 1938. The character actor remains perhaps best remembered for his role as abolitionist U.S. Representative Austin Stoneman in D. W. Griffith's The Birth of a Nation (1915) and the governor in Intolerance (1916). Lewis's film debut came in 1912. He also starred in one of the early Hollywood sound shorts, Gaunt, in 1931. He was married to actress Vera Lewis.

Lewis died in Los Angeles, California, on December 4, 1937, after being hit on November 25, 1937 by a limousine driven by a chauffeur working for Jack L. Warner.

Filmography

 The Great Leap: Until Death Do Us Part (1914) (film debut)
 Home, Sweet Home (1914)
 The Escape (1914) - The Senator
 The Avenging Conscience (1914) - The Detective (film debut)
 The Floor Above (1914, Short) - Jerome
 The Birth of a Nation (1915) - Hon. Austin Stoneman - Leader of the House
 The Wolf Man (1915) - Hilbert Grinde, 'The Wolf Man'
 Jordan Is a Hard Road (1915) - Jim Starbuck
 Let Katie Do It (1916) - Uncle Dan Standish
 Martha's Vindication (1916) - Deacon Hunt
 The Flying Torpedo (1916) - Head of the Board
 Macbeth (1916) - Banquo
 Going Straight (1916) - John Remington
 Hell-to-Pay Austin (1916) - Dad Dawson
 Gretchen the Greenhorn (1916) - Jan Van Houck
 Intolerance (1916) - The Governor
 A Sister of Six (1916) - Caleb Winthrop
 The Children Pay (1916) - Theodore Ainsley - the Girls' Father
 A Tale of Two Cities (1917) - Roger Cly
 Her Temptation (1917) - Ralph Stuart
 The Silent Lie (1917) - Hatfield
 Jack and the Beanstalk (1917) - Francis' Father
 This Is the Life (1917) - Count Herman von Nuttenberg
 Cheating the Public (1918) - John Dowling
 Revenge (1918) - 'Sudden' Duncan
 The Kid Is Clever (1918) - Jazzbando Boullion
 Fires of Youth (1918) - John Linforth
 The Talk of the Town (1918)
 The Dub (1919) - Frederick Blatch
 The Long Lane's Turning (1919) - Gov. Eveland
 The Mother and the Law (1919) - The Governor
 The Valley of the Giants (1919) - Col. Pennington
 The Hoodlum (1919) - Alexander Guthrie
 Eyes of Youth (1919) - Robert Goring
 When the Clouds Roll By (1919) - Curtis Brown
 What Women Love (1920) - James King Cotton
 813 (1920) - Robert Castleback
 Outside the Law (1920) - Silent Madden
 Common Sense (1920) - Dan Bowers
 Prisoners of Love (1921) - Her Father
 Man, Woman & Marriage (1921) - The Father
 Sowing the Wind (1921) - Brabazon
 Salvage (1921) - Cyrus Ridgeway
 A Private Scandal (1921) - Phillip Lawton
 The Conquering Power (1921) - Pere Grandet
 The $5 Baby (1922) - Ben Shapinsky
 In the Name of the Law (1922) - Patrick O'Hara
 Flesh and Blood (1922) - Fletcher Burton
 The Sin Flood (1922) - Fraser
 Broad Daylight (1922) - Peter Fay
 Environment (1922) - Diamond Jim Favre
 The Third Alarm (1922) - Dan McDowell
 The Fog (1923) - Johnathan Forge
 The West~Bound Limited (1923) - Bill Buckley
 Vengeance of the Deep (1923) - Captain Musgrove
 Tea: With a Kick! (1923) - Jim Day
 Desire (1923) - De Witt Harlan
 Blow Your Own Horn (1923) - Nicholas Small
 The Mailman (1923) - Bob Morley
 Untamed Youth (1924) - Joe Ardis
 The Man Who Came Back (1924) - Thomas Potter
 Dante's Inferno (1924) - The Man - Mortimer Judd
 In Every Woman's Life (1924) - Captain
 East of Broadway (1924) - Commissioner
 The Bridge of Sighs (1925) - William Craig
 Who Cares (1925) - Grandfather Ludlow
 The Million Dollar Handicap (1925) - John Porter
 The Re-Creation of Brian Kent (1925) - Homer Ward
 The Overland Limited (1925) - Ed Barton
 Heir-Loons (1925)
 One of the Bravest (1925) - John Kelly
 The Last Edition (1925) - Tom McDonald
 The Lady from Hell (1926) - Earl of Kennet
 Shadow of the Law (1926) - Brophy
 Fascinating Youth (1926) - John Ward
 Bigger Than Barnum's (1926) - Peter Blandin
 The Block Signal (1926) - 'Jovial Joe' Ryan
 The False Alarm (1926) - Fighting John Casey
 The Silent Power (1926) - John Rollins
 Held by the Law (1927) - George Travis
 The Sunset Derby (1927) - Sam Gibson
 The Shield of Honor (1927) - Dan MacDowell
 Casey Jones (1927) - Casey Jones
 Outcast Souls (1928) - John Turner
Crooks Can't Win (1928) - Dad Gillen
 The Girl in the Glass Cage (1929) - John Cosgrove
 The Bad One (1930) - Blochet
 Abraham Lincoln (1930) - Member of Lincoln's Cabinet (uncredited)
 The Fourth Alarm (1930) - Chief Turner
 The Lost Squadron (1930) - Joe
 American Madness (1932) - Judge (uncredited)
 McKenna of the Mounted (1932) - Kennedy
 Strange Justice (1932) - Prison Warden (uncredited)
 Call Her Savage (1932) - Doctor (uncredited)
 The Death Kiss (1932) - Winchell (uncredited)
 Sucker Money (1933) - John Walton
 Somewhere in Sonora (1933) - Mr. Kelly Burton
 Riot Squad (1933) - Judge Nathaniel Moore
 Mystery Liner (1934) - Prof. Grimson
 Badge of Honor (1934) - Randall Brewster
 Fighting Hero (1934) - The Judge
 Terror of the Plains (1934) - Dad Lansing
 Ready for Love (1934) - Mr. Thompson (uncredited)
 When Lightning Strikes (1934) - Minor Role (uncredited)
 Outlaw Rule (1935) - John Lathrop
 The Lost City (1935, Serial) - Prof. Reynolds [Chs.1-4]
 Behind the Green Lights (1935) - Judge #2 / Lawyer
 Born to Battle (1935) - Justice Hiram McClump
 Sunset Range (1935) - Sheriff
 Diamond Jim (1935) - Man at Bar (uncredited)
 Dr. Socrates (1935) - Bookstore Proprietor (uncredited)
 Thanks a Million (1935) - Politician (uncredited)
 Swifty (1935) - Alec McNiel
 Border Flight (1936) - Boat Captain (uncredited)
 San Francisco (1936) - Founders' Club Member (uncredited)
 The Accusing Finger (1936) - Senator (uncredited)
 Make Way for Tomorrow (1937) - Business Man (uncredited)
 West Bound Limited (1937) - Foreman of the Jury (uncredited)
 Behind the Mike (1937) - Townsman (uncredited)
 Music for Madame (1937) - Henchman (uncredited)
 The Buccaneer (1938) - Prominent Gentleman (uncredited)

References

External links

1872 births
1937 deaths
Road incident deaths in California
American male film actors
American male silent film actors
20th-century American male actors
Male actors from Chicago